Patrick Hunt was a Scottish professional footballer who played as a centre half.

References

Year of birth missing
Year of death missing
Footballers from Glasgow
Scottish footballers
Association football defenders
Hamilton Academical F.C. players
Burnley F.C. players
Alloa Athletic F.C. players
Belfast Celtic F.C. players
Shawfield F.C. players
English Football League players
Scottish Football League players
Scottish Junior Football Association players
NIFL Premiership players